is a Japanese dish that is part of the regional cuisine of Kanazawa and the surrounding Ishikawa region. It is a stew made from duck or chicken meat coated in flour, wheat gluten, vegetables, and mushrooms all simmered together in dashi stock. It is often served as part of kaiseki.

References

Japanese cuisine